Barry Stokes may refer to:

 Barry Stokes (American football) (born 1973), American football offensive lineman 
 Barry Stokes (actor), British actor